Olisthopus rotundatus is a species of ground beetle native to Europe.

References

Olisthopus
Beetles described in 1798
Beetles of Europe